Axinidris stageri is a species of ant in the genus Axinidris. Described by Snelling in 2007, the species is endemic to Tanzania.

Etymology
The species was named after Dr. Kenneth E. Stager, to honour him for his work on ants he collected from around the world.

References

Endemic fauna of Tanzania
Axinidris
Hymenoptera of Africa
Insects described in 2007